The following highways are numbered 842:

United States